A blueberry is a flowering plant and its fruit.

Blueberry may also refer to:

Science
 Blueberry (Cannabis), a strain of cannabis
 Martian blueberry, Martian spherules discovered by the Mars rover

Entertainment
 Blueberry (comics), a series of French graphic novels
 Blueberry (film), a 2004 film loosely based on the series
 "Blueberry", a 1988 song by Lita Ford from Lita
 "Blueberry", a 2009 song by Late of the Pier

Places
 Blueberry Hill (disambiguation)
 Blueberry Island (disambiguation)
 Blueberry River (disambiguation)
 Blueberry Township, Wadena County, Minnesota, United States
 Blueberry, Wisconsin, an unincorporated community in the United States

See also
 European blueberry or bilberry, several species related to blueberry
 Berry Blue (disambiguation)
 Bilberry (disambiguation)